The 2010 Women's Asian Games Volleyball Tournament was the 13th edition of the event, organized by the Asian governing body, the AVC. It was held in Guangzhou, China from November 18 to November 27, 2010. All games were staged at the Guangwai Gymnasium but medal matches were held at the Guangzhou Gymnasium.

Squads

Results
All times are China Standard Time (UTC+08:00)

Preliminary

Group A

|}

Group B

|}

Placement 9–11

Semifinals

|}

Placement 9th–10th

|}

Final round

Quarterfinals

|}

Placement 5–8

|}

Semifinals

|}

Placement 7th–8th

|}

Placement 5th–6th

|}

Bronze medal match

|}

Gold medal match

|}

Final standing

References

Results

External links
Official website

Women